Cisseicoraebus is a genus of beetles in the family Buprestidae, containing the following species:

 Cisseicoraebus bicoloratus Bellamy, 1991
 Cisseicoraebus boudanti Bellamy, 1998
 Cisseicoraebus cisseoides (Saunders, 1974)
 Cisseicoraebus grandis (Kerremans, 1900)
 Cisseicoraebus nigroviolaceus (Deyrolle, 1864)
 Cisseicoraebus opaculus Obenberger, 1932
 Cisseicoraebus piperi (Fisher, 1921)
 Cisseicoraebus pullatus (Saunders, 1874)
 Cisseicoraebus retrolatus (Deyrolle, 1864)
 Cisseicoraebus subgrandis Bellamy, 1998
 Cisseicoraebus violaceus Bellamy, 1998

References

Buprestidae genera